TBR may refer to: 

 Tampa Bay Rays, a Major League Baseball team
 Tampa Bay Rowdies, a USL Championship soccer club
 Tree bisection and reconnection, a tree rearrangement algorithm in computational phylogenetics
 TBR, IATA code for Statesboro-Bulloch County Airport
 TBR1 (T-box, brain, 1), a transcription factor protein
 Teenage Bottlerocket, a punk rock band from Laramie, Wyoming
 Tennessee Board of Regents, a public university system

 This Beautiful Republic, a Christian rock band from Toledo, Ohio
 Tick-borne rickettsiosis

 Tommy Baldwin Racing, a NASCAR race team
 Torpedo bomber reconnaissance
 Tracheobronchial rupture, a type of tracheobronchial injury
 Tracy Beaker Returns, a 2010 CBBC show
 Trickle-bed reactor, a chemical reactor